"Jojo" is a song by Boz Scaggs. It was released in 1980 as the second single from his album Middle Man. The song talks about a pimp working in Broadway.

Like the album's other single "Breakdown Dead Ahead", the song is a Top 20 hit, peaking at No. 17 on the Billboard Hot 100.

Chart performance

References

1980 singles
1980 songs
Boz Scaggs songs
Songs written by Boz Scaggs
Songs written by David Foster
Songs written by David Lasley
Columbia Records singles